Mastema ( Mastēmā;  Mesetēma), or Mansemat,  is the fallen archangel who appears in the Book of Jubilees. He pleads with God to permit the demon spirits of the dead Nephilim remain on earth so they can corrupt and lead men astray prior to judgement.  Because there was great wickedness in men, God condemned all the demons to descend into condemnation except for a tenth who could remain. 

In the Zadokite Fragments and the Dead Sea Scrolls, he is the angel of disaster, the father of all evil, and a flatterer of God. He is said to have become a fallen angel. He first appears in the literature of the Second Temple Period as a personification of the Hebrew word mastemah (מַשְׂטֵמָה), meaning "hatred", "hostility", "enmity", or "persecution".

Book of Jubilees
According to the Book of Jubilees, Mastema ("hostility") is the chief of the Nephilim, the demons engendered by the fallen angels called Watchers with human women.

The Book of Jubilees leaves ambiguous whether Mastema himself is a Naphil or not. It is implied he might be an angel instead, as he does not fear to be imprisoned along with the Nephilim, but the book doesn't mention him among the angels created by God, and the matter is blurred further because angels and other kinds of spirits are not clearly differentiated in the work's theology, allowing for multiple interpretations of his origin.

His actions and name indicate he is the Adversary, but in Jubilees he is more like the character who appears in the Book of Job with a function to fulfill under God rather than the Satan of later tradition who is the uttermost enemy of God. Beliar, mentioned twice in Jubilees, is likely to be identical with Mastema in this work.

When God is ready to destroy all the demons after the flood Mastema intervenes, beseeching God to allow him to retain and control one tenth of the demons in order to exercise his authority because they are "intended to corrupt and lead astray before my judgement because the evil of the sons of men is great". (Jubilees 10:8) Mastema is the tester of humans, with God's permission.

Mastema sends a plague of birds onto the land in the days of Terah. (Jubilees 11:10)

Later, Mastema counsels God to test Abraham (Jubilees 17:15-16), just as Satan in the Book of Job wants permission to test Job. As Abraham prepares to sacrifice his son Isaac, Mastema stands in God's presence. On his deathbed, Isaac promises that the spirits of Mastema will have no power to turn Jacob or his descendants away from Yahweh.

The strange account in  where Yahweh meets Moses by the way and tries to kill him is retold in a way that attributes the attack to Mastema instead (Jubilees 48:1-3). It is claimed that Mastema aided the Egyptian priests that opposed Moses. Mastema is also said to have been chained while the Israelites left Egypt, but then let go to encourage the Egyptians to chase after the Israelites and so come to their doom in the Red Sea. The deaths of the firstborn of the Egyptians are attributed to "all the powers of Mastema".

In fiction
In Anne Rice's 1999 novel Vittorio the Vampire, Mastema is an angel that aids the main character in attacking a vampire coven.
In the Megami Tensei series of video games and its spin-offs, Mastema is portrayed as a demon, although, within the context of the franchise, the term "demon" is used in its classical meaning (cf. daemon) to refer to any supernatural creature. Mastema can be fought but can also join the player's group. In Strange Journey, Mastema plays a relatively big role in the story as he represents the Law alignment within the game
In the Digimon game, Digimon Story: Cyber Sleuth, Mastemon is an Angel Digimon who manipulates light and darkness, and has the power to cross through space-time.
In the Yu-Gi-Oh! trading card game, the card "Darklord Nasten" (堕天使マスティマ, datenshi [= Fallen Angel] Mastema) is based on this demon.
In the comic book Birthright, Mastema is the name of one of the mages living on Earth that maintain the barrier between worlds. She is revealed shortly after her introduction to be the daughter of the series' main villain.
In the mobile game Arknights, Mostima is the name of an operator that has angelic and demonic qualities.

See also
 List of angels in theology

References

External links
MASTEMA by David Flusser. Encyclopaedia Judaica article at Encyclopedia.com

Demons in the Old Testament apocrypha
Angels in Judaism
Satan
Fallen angels
Book of Jubilees